Pura Vida Bracelets is a La Jolla, California–based company that sells hand-crafted bracelets and jewelry online and through boutique stores. It was founded in 2010 by Griffin Thall and Paul Goodman, who discovered the bracelets while on a vacation in Costa Rica, then took the local phrase and turned into a brand of cheap goods. After a number of celebrities were spotted wearing the product, interest increased, and the company has since sold over two million bracelets. Pura Vida partners with a number of charities, producing bracelets in those charities' colors and donating a portion of those bracelets' sale prices back towards the partner charities.

About
The company, which is based in La Jolla, California, was founded by Griffin Thall and Paul Goodman in 2010. Thall and Goodman traveled to Costa Rica together on vacation after graduating from San Diego State University, where they met a pair of bracelet makers named Joaquin and Jorge. They then purchased 400 bracelets for $100 to bring back to the United States. The pair initially sold their original stock at Planet Blue, a small boutique located in Malibu, California. After a number of celebrities – including reality television personality Lauren Conrad, soccer player David Beckham, and musicians Rihanna and Skrillex – were seen with the bracelets, Pura Vida saw an increase in web traffic and sales. By late 2013, Pura Vida had grown to a dozen US-based staff and 50 Costa Rica-based staff. By the end of 2015, the number of Costa Rica-based employees had doubled to over 100. As of March 2015, Pura Vida moved 125,000 bracelets a month through 3,400 physical retail outlets and through their website. As of February 2015, over two million bracelets have been sold. As of July 2019, the company has over 650 employees that work to create these bracelets. Pura Vida means "pure life" in Spanish; in Costa Rica it is said frequently and has many meanings, such as hello, goodbye, or even to say thank you. In an interview, Thall and Goodman called the term "the slogan of Costa Rica, just like the word 'aloha' from Hawaii".

The company initially began with the original 9-string bracelet model and later expanded their product line with the addition of different style bracelets. These bracelets include braided styles, charm bracelets, and bead bracelets. Griffin Thall and Paul Goodman explained that the charms on their products represent waves and mountains because they allude to the Pura Vida lifestyle. Pura Vida Bracelets can be found on many social media platforms such as Instagram and Twitter. As of April 2020, the company's Instagram account has over 1.9 million followers.

Pura Vida also creates bracelets for charitable organizations, as a cause marketing fundraiser; bracelets are produced in a charitable organization's colors, and a portion of the sale of those bracelets goes to that charitable organization. As of March 2019, over $1.7 million has been donated to charitable organizations; over 174 charities have been the beneficiaries of this program. In the aftermath of the Sandy Hook Elementary School shooting, Pura Vida sold a memorial bracelet and was able to provide $30,000 to the memorial fund. In addition to producing its own line of products, Pura Vida produces bracelets for the MyIntent Project. Other charities Pura Vida Bracelet's has partnered with include: The American Heart Association, Shatterproof, UNICEF, charity:water, The Surfrider Foundation, Peach's Neat Feet, and many others listed on their website. In 2019, Vera Bradley purchased a 75% stakeholder share in Pura Vida’s parent company, Creative Genius. The 75% of the company was valued at $75 million. They have the option to purchase the remainder of the company in 2024.

References

Online jewelry retailers of the United States
Retail companies based in California
Companies based in San Diego
La Jolla, San Diego
Design companies established in 2010
Retail companies established in 2010
2010 establishments in California